Danica Mae McKellar (born January 3, 1975) is an American actress, mathematics writer, and education advocate. She played Winnie Cooper in the television series The Wonder Years from 1988 to 1993, and since 2010 has voiced Miss Martian in the animated superhero series Young Justice.

In 2015, McKellar was cast in the Netflix original series Project Mc2. She appears in several television films for Hallmark Channel. She is the current voice of Judy Jetson from The Jetsons since 2017 following Janet Waldo's death in 2016.

In addition to her acting work, McKellar later wrote six non-fiction books, all dealing with mathematics: Math Doesn't Suck, Kiss My Math, Hot X: Algebra Exposed, Girls Get Curves: Geometry Takes Shape, which encourage middle-school and high-school girls to have confidence and succeed in mathematics, Goodnight, Numbers, and Do Not Open This Math Book.

Early life and education 
McKellar was born in La Jolla, California. She moved with her family to Los Angeles when she was eight. Her mother Mahaila McKellar (née Tello) was a homemaker; her father Christopher McKellar is a real estate developer; her younger sister Crystal (b. 1976) is a lawyer. She is of paternal Scottish, French, German, Spanish, and Dutch descent and her mother is of Portuguese origin via the Azores and Madeira islands.

McKellar studied at the University of California, Los Angeles where she was a member of the Alpha Delta Pi sorority and earned a Bachelor of Science degree summa cum laude in Mathematics in 1998. Their results are termed the "Chayes–McKellar–Winn theorem". Later, when Chayes was asked to comment about the mathematical abilities of his student coauthors, he was quoted in The New York Times, "I thought that the two were really, really first-rate." For her past collaborative work on research papers, McKellar is currently assigned the Erdős number four, and her Erdős–Bacon number is six.

Acting career

The Wonder Years and early acting career  
At age seven, McKellar enrolled in weekend acting classes for children at the Lee Strasberg Institute in Los Angeles. In her teens, she landed a prominent role in The Wonder Years, an American television comedy-drama that ran for six seasons on ABC, from 1988 to 1993. She played Gwendolyn "Winnie" Cooper, the main love interest of Kevin Arnold (played by Fred Savage) on the show. Her first kiss was with Fred Savage in an episode of The Wonder Years. She later said, "My first kiss was a pretty nerve-wracking experience! But we never kissed off screen, and pretty quickly our feelings turned into brother/sister, and stayed that way."

Later acting career 

McKellar has said that she found it "difficult" to move from being a child actress to an adult actress. Since leaving The Wonder Years, McKellar has had several guest roles in television series (including one with former co-star Fred Savage on Working), and has written and directed two short films. She appeared in two Lifetime films in the Moment of Truth series, playing Kristin Guthrie in 1994's Cradle of Conspiracy and Annie Mills Carman in 1996's Justice for Annie. She briefly returned to regular television with a recurring role in the 2002–03 season of The West Wing, portraying Elsie Snuffin, the half-sister and assistant of Deputy White House Communications Director Will Bailey.

McKellar was featured in the video for Debbie Gibson's eighth single from the Electric Youth album, "No More Rhyme", which was released in 1989. She plays the cello in the beginning of the video.

McKellar appeared in lingerie in the July 2005 edition of Stuff magazine after readers voted her the 1990s star they would most like to see in lingerie. McKellar explained that she agreed to the shoot in part to obtain "grittier roles".

In 2006, McKellar starred in a Lifetime film and web-based series titled Inspector Mom about a mother who solves mysteries.

On the August 1, 2007, edition of the Don and Mike Show, a WJFK-FM radio program out of Washington, D.C., McKellar announced that the producers of How I Met Your Mother were planning to bring her back for a recurring role (she guest-starred on the show in late 2005 in "The Pineapple Incident" and again in early 2007 in "Third Wheel"). She also made an appearance on the show The Big Bang Theory, in the episode "The Psychic Vortex".

In 2008, she starred in Heatstroke, a Sci-Fi Channel film about searching for alien life on Earth and in 2009 she was one of the stars commenting on the occurrences of the new millennium in VH1's I Love the New Millennium and was the math correspondent for Brink, a program by the Science Channel about technology. In 2013, she played Ellen Plainview in Lifetime's reimagining of the 1956 Alfred Hitchcock film The Wrong Man.

McKellar has also worked as a voice actress, having provided the voice of Jubilee in the video game X-Men Legends (2004), and Invisible Woman in Marvel: Ultimate Alliance (2006) and Marvel: Ultimate Alliance 2 (2009). She provided the voice of Miss Martian in the TV series Young Justice.

In 2012, she starred in the Lifetime film Love at the Christmas Table with Dustin Milligan.

In January 2013, she starred in the Syfy film Tasmanian Devils with Apolo Ohno.

On August 20, 2013, Canadian singer Avril Lavigne released the music video for her single "Rock N Roll" from her self-titled fifth album, which features McKellar as "Winnie Cooper".

On March 4, 2014, she was announced to be competing on season 18 of Dancing with the Stars. She paired with Valentin Chmerkovskiy. McKellar and Chmerkovskiy were eliminated on Week 8, finishing in 6th place.

She had a guest appearance in the Impractical Jokers season four episode six titled "The Blunder Years". She made another guest appearance in the season seven episode ten titled "Speech Impediment".

In 2015, she starred in the Netflix original series Project Mc2 as The Quail.

She has starred in several Hallmark Channel films, including Crown for Christmas, My Christmas Dream, Campfire Kiss, Love and Sunshine, Christmas at Dollywood, and You, Me & the Christmas Trees as well as the Hallmark Movies & Mysteries series The Matchmaker Mysteries.

McKellar is a judge on Fox’s Domino Masters which premiered on March 9, 2022.

Books 
McKellar has authored several mathematics-related books primarily targeting adolescent readers interested in succeeding at the study of mathematics:
 
 
 
 

Her first book, Math Doesn't Suck: How to Survive Middle School Math without Losing Your Mind or Breaking a Nail, was a New York Times bestseller, and was favorably reviewed by Tara C. Smith, the founder of Iowa Citizens for Science and a professor of epidemiology at the University of Iowa. The book also received a review from Anthony Jones, writing for the School Librarian journal, who described the book as "a trouble-shooting guide to help girls overcome their biggest maths challenges," noting what he described as "real-world examples of great mathematics in action." In an interview with Smith, McKellar said that she wrote the book "to show girls that math is accessible and relevant, and even a little glamorous" and to counteract "damaging social messages telling young girls that math and science aren't for them".

McKellar's second book, Kiss My Math: Showing Pre-Algebra Who's Boss, was released on August 5, 2008. The book's target audience is girls in the 7th through 9th grades. Her third book, Hot X: Algebra Exposed! covers algebra topics, while the previous two titles were intended as "algebra-readiness books." Hot X was published on August 3, 2010. Her fourth book, Girls Get Curves – Geometry Takes Shape, focuses on the subject of geometry, and attempts to make the subject more accessible.

Three of McKellar's books were listed in The New York Times children's bestseller list. She received Mathical Honors for Goodnight, Numbers.

Published papers

Awards and honors
McKellar was named Person of the Week on World News with Charles Gibson for the week ending August 10, 2007. The news segment highlighted her book Math Doesn't Suck and her efforts to help girls develop an interest in mathematics, especially during the middle school years. In January 2014, she received the Joint Policy Board for Mathematics (JPBM) Communications Award. The citation credited her books, blog, and public appearances for encouraging "countless middle and high school students, especially girls, to be more interested in mathematics."

Personal life 
McKellar married composer Mike Verta on March 22, 2009, in La Jolla, California; the couple had dated since 2001. They had their first child, a son named Draco, in 2010.  McKellar filed for divorce from Verta in June 2012.

McKellar has homeschooled Draco his entire life, and many of her math books’ themes are inspired by at-home instruction.

On July 16, 2014, she became engaged to her boyfriend Scott Sveslosky, a partner in the Los Angeles legal firm Sheppard, Mullin, Richter & Hampton. On November 15, 2014, they married in Kauai, Hawaii.

McKellar is a Christian and regularly attends church services. She cites Candace Cameron Bure as being a major influence in her life after Bure gave her a copy of the Bible.

Cultural references 
McKellar's notoriety for Hallmark mystery films was spoofed in the 2019 film Knives Out, complete with the parody title Deadly By Surprise.

Filmography

Film

Television

Music videos

Video Games

Further reading

References

External links 

 
 
 
 Danica McKellar's blog
 Website for McKellar Math
 Website of Math Doesn't Suck
 Website for Kiss My Math
 Interview with McKellar about her theorem at NPR
 February 2006 Proof and Prejudice: Women in Mathematics Conference, at which McKellar was a speaker
 Science Friday for September 21, 2007 with McKellar among the guests
 Public School Insights Interview with McKellar about girls and math

1975 births
20th-century American actresses
21st-century American actresses
21st-century American mathematicians
21st-century American screenwriters
21st-century American women writers
21st-century women mathematicians
Actresses from Los Angeles
Actresses from San Diego
American child actresses
American film actresses
American people of Dutch descent
American people of French descent
American people of German descent
American people of Portuguese descent
American people of Scottish descent
American people of Spanish descent
American television actresses
American television writers
American video game actresses
American voice actresses
American women film directors
American women mathematicians
American women television writers
Film directors from Los Angeles
Harvard-Westlake School alumni
Lee Strasberg Theatre and Film Institute alumni
Living people
Mathematics writers
People from La Jolla, San Diego
Screenwriters from California
University of California, Los Angeles alumni